Charles C. Papy Jr. (August 18, 1927 – January 2, 2009) was an American politician. He served as a Democratic member for the 117th district of the Florida House of Representatives.

Life and career 
Papy was born in Miami, Florida.

In 1972, Papy was elected to represent the 117th district of the Florida House of Representatives, succeeding Jim K. Tillman. He served until 1978, when he was succeeded by Bill Flynn.

Papy died in January 2009, at the age of 81.

References 

1927 births
2009 deaths
Politicians from Miami
Democratic Party members of the Florida House of Representatives
20th-century American politicians